Zythos modesta is a moth of the family Geometridaefirst described by Katsumi Yazaki in 1996. It is found on the island of Bohol in the Philippines.

The wingspan is about 32 mm.

References

Moths described in 1996
Scopulini
Insects of the Philippines
Fauna of Bohol